Samira Asghari (born 31 March 1994) is a member of the International Olympic Committee for Afghanistan since 2018. Upon her election at the age of 24, Asghari became the first representative from Afghanistan and one of the youngest ever members to join the IOC. Before being selected for the IOC, Asghari played for the Afghanistan women's national basketball team and worked for the Afghanistan National Olympic Committee during the 2010s. With the ANOC, Asghari briefly held the finance director and Deputy Secretary General positions in the early to mid 2010s.

Early life and education
On 31 March 1994, Asghari was born in the Jalrez District, Afghanistan. Shortly after her birth, Asghari and her family became war refugees and moved to Iran. Growing up, Asghari played association football and basketball while attending school. For her post-secondary education, Asghari went to Kateb University for a Bachelor of Arts in international relations.

Career
During the 2010s, Asghari joined the Afghanistan women's national basketball team and was named captain of the Afghan basketball team. Outside of basketball, Asghari worked for an Afghan agency in women's sports before starting her Olympic career
with the Afghanistan National Olympic Committee. With the NOC, Asghari first held positions in women's sports and international relations. As an executive for the NOC, Asghari held one year positions as finance director and Deputy Secretary General during the early to mid 2010s. During this time period, Asghari joined committees for the Olympic Council of Asia and International Olympic Committee in 2014.

In 2018, Asghari became the first elected member of the International Olympic Committee from Afghanistan. Her election made Asghari one of the youngest ever members of the IOC when she joined at age 24. As part of the committee, Asghari was selected to join a commission for future winter Olympics in 2019.

Awards and honors
In 2019, the Afghanistan Sports Journalists Federation presented Asghari with the Sports Personality of the Year award.

References

1994 births
Afghan basketball players
International Olympic Committee members
Living people
Jalrez District